Scymnus is a genus of beetle in the family Coccinellidae. It is the type genus of the subfamily Scymninae and the tribe Scymnini.

Species
According to the Natural History Museum, the species in genus Scymnus are:

Subgenus Scymnus
Scymnus femoralis (Gyllenhal, 1827)
Scymnus frontalis (Fabricius, 1787)
Scymnus interruptus (Goeze, 1777)
Scymnus jakowlewi Weise, 1892
Scymnus nigrinus Kugelann, 1794
Scymnus rubromaculatus (Goeze, 1777)
Scymnus schmidti Fürsch, 1958

Subgenus Pullus
Scymnus auritus Thunberg, 1795
Scymnus suturalis Thunberg, 1795

Subgenus Neopullus
Scymnus haemorrhoidalis Herbst, 1797
Scymnus limbatus  Stephens, 1832

Other catalogs list more than 200 species.

See also
 List of Scymnus species

References

Coccinellidae genera
Coccinellidae